The following is an incomplete list of articles related to the city of Kohima, Nagaland, sorted in alphabetical order. To learn quickly what Kohima is, see Outline of Kohima.

Quick index 



0–9

19 
 1986 Killing of Kekuojalie Sachü and Vikhozo Yhoshü
 1995 Kohima massacre

20 
 2022 Nagaland Olympic & Paralympic Games
 2023 Kohima fire

A

Ag 
 Agri Farm Ward

Ai 
 AIR FM Tragopan

Al 
 Alder College

An 
 Angami Zapu Phizo
 Andrea Kevichüsa

B

Ba 
 Baptist College, Kohima
 Battle of Kohima
 Battle of the Tennis Court
 Bayavü Hill Ward

C

Ca 
 Capi (newspaper)

Ch 
 Chalie Kevichüsa

D

Da 
 Daklane Ward

Db 
 D. Block Ward

Di 
 Dimapur–Kohima Expressway

Dz 
 Dzüvürü Ward

E

El 
 Electrical Ward

F

Fo 
 Forest Ward, Kohima

G

H

He 
 Hekani Jakhalu Kense

Ho 
 Hornbill Festival
 Hovithal Sothü

I

In 
 Indira Gandhi Stadium, Kohima

J

Ja 
 Jail Ward
 Jain Temple Kohima

Jo 
 Jonathan Yhome

K

Ke 
 Kenuozou Hill Ward
 Kewhira Dielie
 Keziekie Ward

Kh 
 Khriehu Liezietsu

Ki 
 Kitsübozou Ward

Ko 
 Kohima
 Kohima Ao Baptist Church
 Kohima Botanical Garden
 Kohima Camp
 Kohima Capital Cultural Center
 Kohima Chiethu Airport
 Kohima (disambiguation)
 Kohima district
 Kohima Komets
 Kohima Law College
 Kohima Lotha Baptist Church
 Kohima Municipal Council
 Kohima North Police Station
 Kohima Science College
 Kohima Stone Inscription
 Kohima Town (Vidhan Sabha constituency)
 Kohima Village
 Kohima War Cemetery
 Kohima Zubza Railway Station

Kr 
 KROS College, Kohima

L

Le 
 Lerie Ward

Lh 
 Lhüthiprü Vasa

Li 
 List of higher education and academic institutions in Kohima

Lo 
 Lower Mediezie Ward
 Lower Chandmari Ward
 Lower Police Reserve Hill Ward
 Lower PWD Ward

M

Ma 
 Macnivil
 Mary Help of Christians Cathedral, Kohima

Me 
 Mengu Süokhrie
 Merhülietsa Ward
 Methaneilie Solo
 Mezhür Higher Secondary School

Mi 
 Middle PWD Ward
 Midland Ward
 Ministers' Hill Baptist Higher Secondary School
 Miss Nagaland

Mo 
 Model Christian College, Kohima

Mu 
 Municipal Wards of Kohima

N

Na 
 Naga Bazaar Ward
 Naga Hospital Authority
 Naga Hospital Ward
 Nagaland Medical College
 Nagaland State Library
 Nagaland State Museum
 Nagaland Wrestling Association
 Naga Wrestling Championship
 NAJ Cosfest

Ne 
 Neidonuo Angami
 Neiliezhü Üsou
 New Market Ward
 New Ministers' Hill Ward
 New Reserve Ward

O

Ol 
 Old Ministers' Hill Ward

P

Pe 
 Peraciezie Ward

Po 
 Police Reserve Hill Ward

Pu 
 Pulie Badze
 Pulie Badze Wildlife Sanctuary

R

Ra 
 Raj Bhavan, Kohima
 Razhukhrielie Kevichüsa

Re 
 Regional Centre of Excellence for Music & Performing Arts

Ro 
 Roman Catholic Diocese of Kohima

S

Sa 
 Sakhrie Park
 Salhoutuonuo Kruse

Se 
 Sepfüzou Ward
 Sesino Yhoshü

Sh 
 Shürhozelie Liezietsu

T

Te 
 Tetseo Sisters

Th 
 Thegabakha Ward

Ts 
 Tseilhoutuo Rhütso
 Tsiepfü Tsiepfhe Ward

U

Up 
 Upper Mediezie Ward
 Upper Chandmari Ward
 Upper PWD Ward

Y

Yo 
 YouthNet

See also 
 Outline of Kohima

Kohima-related lists